The Talbiyah is a Muslim prayer invoked by the pilgrims as a conviction that they intend to perform the Hajj only for the glory of Allah. Talbiyah is repeatedly invoked during the Hajj, or pilgrimage, upon putting on the Ihram, so the pilgrims can purify and rid themselves of worldly concerns.

The text of the Talbiyah is:

The Shia version of the talbiyah is exactly the same as the Sunni one but ends with an extra "Labbayk."

There is disagreement among grammarians of Arabic as to the origin of the expression labbayka. The most prevalent explanation analyses it as the verbal noun (maṣdar) labb (meaning to remain in a place) + ay (oblique form of the dual in construct) + ka (second-person singular masculine suffix). The dual is said to indicate repetition and frequency. Therefore, labbayka means literally something like "I will stick to obeying you again and again." Talbiyah is the verbal noun of labbá, meaning to pronounce this prayer.

References

External links 
التلبية هي شعار المؤمنين الموحدين

Islamic prayer
Hajj
Hajj terminology